Dame Darcey Andrea Bussell,  (born Marnie Mercedes Darcey Pemberton Crittle; 27 April 1969) is an English retired ballerina and a former judge on the BBC television dance contest  Strictly Come Dancing.

Trained at the Arts Educational School and the Royal Ballet School, Bussell started her professional career at Sadlers Wells Royal Ballet, but after only one year she moved to the Royal Ballet, where she became the youngest-ever principal dancer at the age of 20 in 1989. Bussell is widely acclaimed as one of the great British ballerinas.

Bussell remained with The Royal Ballet for her whole career, more than two decades, but also performed as a guest artist with many leading companies including NYCB, La Scala Theatre Ballet, the Kirov Ballet, Hamburg Ballet and the Australian Ballet. She retired from ballet in 2007.

Bussell is also pursuing parallel careers in television, books and modelling, and supports numerous British and international charities and dance institutions.

Early life
Darcey Bussell was born in London to Australian businessman John Crittle and his English wife, Andrea Williams.

After the couple divorced when Bussell was three, her mother remarried and Bussell was adopted by her mother's new husband, Australian dentist Philip Bussell. The family spent some time in Australia, where Bussell attended school before they returned to London for Bussell to be educated at Fox Primary School in Kensington. She was diagnosed with dyslexia at age nine.

Career 
Bussell studied "all forms of stagecraft" at the Arts Educational School, before joining the Royal Ballet Lower School, based at White Lodge, Richmond Park, aged 13. At 16, she progressed to the Royal Ballet Upper School in Baron's Court, before joining the Sadler's Wells Royal Ballet in 1987. While studying at the Royal Ballet School, she appeared in a number of school productions, including performances at the Royal Opera House.

While Bussell was still at school, the choreographer Kenneth MacMillan had noticed her exceptional technique, and in 1988 he decided to use her to create the leading role in his ballet The Prince of the Pagodas to Benjamin Britten's music, which led to her moving to the Royal Ballet. A year later, in December 1989 on the opening night of the show, she was promoted to principal dancer at just 20 years old.

Bussell performed all the major classical roles numerous times throughout her career, including Masha in Winter Dreams and Princess Rose in The Prince of the Pagodas, both choreographed by MacMillan, as well as Princess Aurora in The Sleeping Beauty, Odette/Odile in Swan Lake, Nikiya and Gamzatti in La Bayadère, the Sugar Plum Fairy in The Nutcracker, Manon in L'histoire de Manon, and Giselle in Giselle.

In total, she performed more than 80 different roles and 17 roles were created for her. In Sleeping Beauty alone, she performed Aurora in four different productions, one of which was Sir Anthony Dowell's production which she opened at the Kennedy Center in Washington, D.C. in front of President Clinton. She made several guest appearances with the New York City Ballet, starting in June 1993, with a performance of the pas de deux from Agon.

Bussell also guested with the Balletto Della Scala, Kirov Ballet, Paris Opera Ballet, Hamburg Ballet and the Australian Ballet. She danced the première of Sylvia by Léo Delibes choreographed by Sir Frederick Ashton at the Royal Opera House, Covent Garden on 4 November 2004. In 2006, she announced her retirement as a principal dancer at the Royal Ballet, though stayed with the company as guest principal artist.

She retired from ballet on 8 June 2007 with a performance of MacMillan's Song of the Earth (music Gustav Mahler: Das Lied von der Erde). It was performed at the Royal Opera House in London, and broadcast live on BBC Two.

In 2012 Bussell participated in the 2012 Summer Olympics closing ceremony, leading a troupe of 200 ballerinas and 4 male dancers from the Royal Ballet. The performance was known as "the Spirit of the Flame" and preceded the official dousing of the Olympic flame.

In 2016 Bussell launched a charity called DDMIX (Diverse dance mix) aimed at bringing dance into state schools. Working with choreographer and dancer, Nathan Clarke, DDMIX features dance elements from various styles including Irish, tango, waltz, jive, Bollywood, disco, flamenco, salsa and 1960's twist. 

In 2020, she launched Move Assure, a social enterprise. Teaming up with Dr Peter Lovatt and Lindsey Lovatt, it aims to deliver a dance program that can be used as a social prescription.

Other ventures

Modelling

Bussell has modelled clothes for Mulberry, Bruce Oldfield and Marks & Spencer. She has also been photographed for Tatler, Vogue and Vanity Fair. She was famously photographed with a diamond in her mouth in a promotion for De Beers. Bussell modelled the first ever jewellery collection for the World Gold Council. She has modelled for American Express and featured in a TV commercial for Lloyds Bank. From 2009 to 2013, she was the face of The Sanctuary Spa. In 2014, she was an ambassador for Silvikrin (Wella / Procter & Gamble) hair products.

Writing

In October 2008 HarperCollins Children's Books released six short books in a new children's series called Magic Ballerina. Bussell had initiated the idea and storyline, and the books were written using a series of ghost writers. They feature a girl named Delphie who joins a ballet school and discovers her shoes are magical. Within three years at least 23 Magic Ballerina stories were published, all featuring girls who own magic sparkly red ballet shoes. The Magic Ballerina books have been published in over 10 territories. Sales have exceeded 1.4m copies. At least the first two were illustrated by Katie May.

She co-wrote The Young Dancer with the Royal Ballet School and wrote an introduction to the book The Illustrated Book of Ballet by Barbara Newman, which showcases five of the ballets in which she starred. An autobiographical picture book of her ballet career, titled Darcey Bussell, was released in 2012. followed by Darcey Bussell: Evolved in 2018.

Television
A South Bank Show documentary on Bussell and her fellow principal Viviana Durante was broadcast in October 1992. In 1994 she played her first acting part, playing Olga Khokhlova opposite Brian Cox's Pablo Picasso in Yo Picasso. Bussell guest starred as herself in the popular BBC1 comedy The Vicar of Dibley in 1998. In the episode, she aids Geraldine in a fundraiser and the two perform a pas de deux called "The Mirror".

In 2004 Bussell was the subject of a documentary titled Britain's Ballerina. Bussell teamed up with Katherine Jenkins to stage a song and dance production titled Viva la Diva, to pay tribute to the stars who inspired them who include Madonna and Judy Garland. Bussell and Jenkins performed a segment of Viva la Diva before the Queen at the 79th Royal Variety Performance which was televised on 9 December 2007. Bussell joined the BBC's Strictly Come Dancing judging panel as a fifth judge in the final stages of the 2009 series. On the semi-final show of the competition she danced a jive with the professional dancer Ian Waite.

In December 2011 Bussell collaborated with choreographer Kim Gavin to make Darcey dances Hollywood, a BBC Two television documentary in which she recreated some of Hollywood's famous dance routines—including some by Gene Kelly and Fred Astaire & Ginger Rogers—from films such as Singin' In The Rain and Top Hat ("Cheek to Cheek").

In 2012 Bussell returned to the Strictly Come Dancing judging panel for the 2012 series as a permanent judge and replacement for Alesha Dixon. At the start of her first appearance as a judge she performed in a feature American Smooth, again partnered with Ian Waite.

On 12 August 2012 Bussell performed at the closing ceremony of the 2012 Summer Olympics, descending from the roof of the Olympic stadium as the 'Spirit of the Flame' and leading a troupe of 200 ballerinas.

In December 2013 Bussell presented a BBC Two documentary titled Darcey's Ballet Heroines. In December 2014 she presented a BBC One documentary on Audrey Hepburn, titled Darcey Bussell: Looking for Audrey. In May 2015, Bussell was co-presenter and dance expert for the Grand Final of the inaugural BBC Young Dancer competition, which was aired live on BBC Two.

In December 2015 Bussell presented an hour-long documentary on BBC Two, Darcey's Ballet Heroes, focussing on Vaslav Nijinsky, Rudolf Nureyev, and other male professionals ballet dancers. In December 2016, she presented a BBC One documentary on Margot Fonteyn, titled Darcey Bussell: Looking for Margot. In December 2017, she presented a BBC One documentary on Fred Astaire, titled Darcey Bussell: Looking for Fred. In December 2018, she presented a BBC Two documentary on the mental health benefits of dance, titled Darcey Bussell: Dancing to Happiness.

She has presented the live cinema relays for The Royal Ballet from the 2013/14 season onwards.

On 10 April 2019 Bussell announced that she had decided to step down as judge from Strictly Come Dancing. She said: "It has been a complete privilege for me to be part of Strictly, working with such a talented team. I have enjoyed every minute of my time and will miss everyone from my fellow judges, the presenters, the dancers, the musicians, the entire back stage team, and especially the viewers of the show, who have been so supportive."

Bussell presented Darcey Bussell's Wild Coasts of Scotland, a four-part travel series which aired on More4 from 8 February to 1 March 2021.

In 2021, she was a guest performer in Coppelia!, a modern retelling of the classical ballet which featured on Great Performances.

On 19 July 2022, the four-part series Darcey Bussell’s Royal Roadtrip, presented by Bussell, will premiere on More4.

Honours and tributes
Bussell was appointed Officer of the Order of the British Empire (OBE) in the 1995 New Year Honours for services to ballet, Commander of the Order of the British Empire (CBE) in the 2006 Birthday Honours, and Dame Commander of the Order of the British Empire (DBE) in the 2018 New Year Honours for services to dance.

In 2019, Megabus named one of their new fleet of coaches 'Darcey Bussell'.

A full-length portrait of her by the artist Allen Jones RA, commissioned by The National Portrait Gallery, London, was unveiled in May 1994.

In 2006, at the Chelsea Flower Show, David Austin Roses launched a new crimson rose called 'Darcey Bussell'.

Bussell is the "godmother" of MS Azura, a 115,000 ton cruise liner of the P&O Cruises fleet. When the ship was officially launched in April 2010, Bussell performed the traditional ceremony of breaking a bottle of champagne to name the ship. She also staged a dance performance with students from the Royal Ballet School.

Awards
In 2006 Bussell became a gold medal recipient from the John F. Kennedy Center for the Performing Arts. She is a recipient of the Carl Alan Award for contributions to dance.

In December 1990 she was voted Dancer of the Year by the readers of Dance and Dancers magazine. In February 1991 she was presented with the Variety Club of Great Britain's Sir James Garreras Award for the most promising newcomer of 1990 and one week later with the London Evening Standard Ballet Award for 1990. In April 1991 she was selected as the joint winner of the Cosmopolitan Achievement Award in the Performing Arts category.

On 18 July 2009 Bussell received an honorary doctorate from the University of Oxford. During the ceremony the university's public orator noted that she "adds to technical mastery, charm and imagination, in such a way that she seems to reveal the grace of her personality as well as the grace of movement… Moreover, she wants those who are perhaps put off by the grand portals of the Royal Opera House to enjoy the pleasures that ballet affords."

In 2017 Bussell received an honorary doctorate from the Royal Conservatoire in Glasgow, Scotland.

In June 2018 Bussell received an honorary Fellowship from Arts University Bournemouth alongside costume designer Jenny Beavan OBE, graphic designer Margaret Calvert OBE and director and screenwriter Edgar Wright. Bussell, who previously visited the university as a guest lecturer, said "I am very honoured. AUB is modern and it is cutting edge, so its graduates successfully feed directly into the creative industries of this country."

Patronages
Since 2012 Bussell has been the president of the Royal Academy of Dance She is Artiste Laureate of The Royal Ballet School and is also a patron of the International Dance Teachers Association, Re:Bourne, London's Children's Ballet, Cecchetti UK, Cecchetti Australia, Dance Proms, Company Chameleon, Du Boisson Dance Foundation, National Youth Ballet and New English Ballet Theatre. Bussell has been campaign president of the Birmingham Royal Ballet's fund raising campaign since 2012. She is an ambassador for the giving programme of the New Zealand School of Dance and is on the board of the Margot Fonteyn Foundation. She is the international patron of the Sydney Dance Company.

She is a patron of the medical charities Borne, Sight for All and the Henry Spink Foundation.

Personal life
In 1997 Bussell married Australian businessman Angus Forbes in Cherwell, Oxfordshire. They originally lived in Kensington, where their two daughters were born in 2001 and 2004. In 2008 the family moved to Sydney, Australia, and returned to London in July 2012. As of 2021, they live in Wimbledon.

References

External links

NY Times, Alastair Macaulay, 12 June 2007
Darcey Bussell at the National Portrait Gallery (seven portraits held)
Dance legend Darcey Bussell's next step | Interview by Chris Wiegand in the Guardian, 19 May 2009

1969 births
Living people
People educated at the Arts Educational Schools
People educated at the Royal Ballet School
British people of Australian descent
Dames Commander of the Order of the British Empire
English ballerinas
Television personalities from London
Prix de Lausanne winners
Principal dancers of The Royal Ballet
Birmingham Royal Ballet dancers
English female models
20th-century British ballet dancers
21st-century British ballet dancers
Dancers from London
Prima ballerinas
People with dyslexia